HMS Thetis was a 38-gun fifth-rate frigate of the Royal Navy launched in 1782.

Career

French Revolutionary Wars
In early 1793, Thetis captured the East Indiaman Trajan, Captain Joseph Boudel, which was coming from Pondicherry. The French privateer  recaptured Trajan and brought her into Bordeaux.
 

The French made a line of battle to receive the British frigates. An action commenced, with three of the French vessels eventually striking their colours. Thetis took possession of the largest, which turned out to be , pierced for 36 guns but only mounting 24. Hussar captured a second, Raison, pierced for 24 guns but only mounting 18. One of the vessels that had struck nonetheless sailed off. Two of the five had broken off the fight and sailed off earlier. (The three that escaped were the Normand, Trajan, and Hernoux.) An hour after she had struck, Prévoyantes main and foremasts fell over the side. In the battle, Thetis had lost eight men killed and 9 wounded; Hussar had only two men wounded.

Four of the French ships had escaped from Guadeloupe on 25 April. They had sailed to American ports to gather provisions and naval stores to bring back to France.

Cochrane had intended to leave the prizes in charge of the cutter Prince Edward after repairing the damage to his vessel during the night. However, a breeze picked up and by morning the escaping French vessels were out of sight. The British sailed with their prizes to Halifax. The British took Prévoyante into the Royal Navy as HMS Prevoyante.

On 20 July, Thetis was in company with Hussar and  when they intercepted the American vessel Cincinnatus, of Wilmington, sailing from Ireland to Wilmington. They pressed many men on board, narrowly exempting the Irish revolutionary Wolfe Tone, who was going to Philadelphia.

In 1797 Thetis recaptured  as Indian Trader was sailing from Cayenne to Baltimore. Thetis sent her into Halifax, Nova Scotia.

In 1801 Thetis took part in Lord Keith's expedition to Egypt. Because Thetis served in the navy's Egyptian campaign (8 March to 2 September 1801), her officers and crew qualified for the clasp "Egypt" to the Naval General Service Medal that the Admiralty authorised in 1850 to all surviving claimants.

Napoleonic Wars

In 1809 boats from Thetis and several other vessels cut out the French 16-gun brig  at Deshaies, Guadeloupe. The landing party first captured the fort at Deshaies, whereupon Nisus surrendered when its guns were turned on her. During the operation,  kept up a six-hour cannonade on Nisus and the battery. Many of the 300 men in the battery fled, as did most of the crew of Nisus before the British could take possession. The British destroyed the battery before withdrawing. British casualties amounted to two men from Thetis being wounded on shore, and two men being wounded on Attentive. The Royal Navy took Nisus into service as HMS Guadaloupe.

Thetis then took part in the storming of the batteries at Anse la Barque.

Thetis also participated in the capture of Guadeloupe in January and February 1810. In 1847 the Admiralty awarded the Naval General Service Medal with clasp "Guadaloupe" to all surviving participants of the campaign.

Fate
Thetis was sold in 1814.

Notes

Citations

References
 
 Gardiner, Robert (1994) The Heavy Frigate. (London: Conway Maritime Press).

External links
 

Minerva-class frigates
1782 ships
Fifth-rate frigates of the Royal Navy